Dr. Nadine George-Graves is the Chair of the Department of Dance and a Professor since 2018 in both that department and the Department of Theatre at The Ohio State University's Department of Dance and a member of the Dance Research Journal Editorial Board. She holds a PhD in Theater and Drama from Northwestern University and a BA in Philosophy and Theater Studies from Yale University.

She was formerly Professor of Theater and Dance at the University of California, San Diego and past president of the Congress on Research in Dance.

She also served on the executive boards of the American Society for Theater Research and the Society of Dance History Scholars, the editorial boards of SDHS and Choreographic Practices, and is a founding member of The Collegium for African Diasporic Dance. George-Graves was Vice Chair of the Department of Theater and Dance and Acting Associate Dean for Arts and Humanities at UC San Diego. She is the editor of the Oxford Handbook of Dance and Theater.

Her creative projects include Architectura, a dance theater piece inspired by architecture, about how we build our lives, Suzan-Lori Parks’ Fucking A, and Topdog/Underdog.

She is a recipient of the 2014 Living Legacy Award from the Women's International Center.

Works
She is the author of a number of articles on African American theater and dance.

Her major works include:
 The Royalty of Negro Vaudeville: The Whitman Sisters and the Negotiation of Race, Gender and Class in African American Theater 1900-1940, 2003, 
Urban Bush Women: Twenty Years of African American Dance Theater, Community Engagement, and Working It Out,  (review), 2012 Sally Banes Award honorable mention of the American Society for Theater Research 
"'Just Like Being at the Zoo', Primitivity and Ragtime Dance", in: Ballroom, Boogie, Shimmy Sham, Shake: A Social and Popular Dance Reader, 2009, pp. 55–71

References

Year of birth missing (living people)
Living people
Dance historians
University of California, San Diego faculty
Black studies scholars